Burtonsville is a locality in Alberta, Canada.

C. Burton, an early postmaster, gave the locality his last name.

References 

Localities in Parkland County